Georgi Ivanov Stoykovski (born 10 May 1941 in Bata, Pazardzhik Province) is a Bulgarian former triple jumper who competed in the 1964 Summer Olympics and in the 1968 Summer Olympics.

References

External links 
 
 
 
 

1941 births
Living people
Bulgarian male triple jumpers
Olympic athletes of Bulgaria
Athletes (track and field) at the 1964 Summer Olympics
Athletes (track and field) at the 1968 Summer Olympics
European Athletics Championships medalists
People from Pazardzhik Province
21st-century Bulgarian people
20th-century Bulgarian people